Corry is a city in northwestern Pennsylvania, United States. With a population of 6,217 at the 2020 United States Census, it is the second largest city in Erie County. Corry is a part of the Erie, PA Metropolitan Statistical Area. The city became famous in the late-19th and early-20th centuries for being the manufacturer of Climax locomotives.

History
Erie County was formed from parts of Allegheny County on March 12, 1800. On May 27, 1861, tracks owned by the Atlantic and Great Western Railroad intersected with those of the Sunbury and Erie Railroad and was called the "Atlantic and Erie Junction". Land at the junction was owned by Hiram Cory, who sold a portion to the Atlantic and Great Western in October 1861. The railroad built a ticket office at the junction and named it for Cory, but through a misspelling it became Corry.

The combination of railroad growth and the discovery of oil in nearby Titusville contributed greatly to Corry's development. This boomtown was chartered as a borough in 1863 and designated as a city in 1866.  Industry has played a big part in Corry's growth, and the Corry Area Historical Society maintains a museum where one of the Climax locomotives (the steam engine used in logging operations that brought fame to Corry) is on display.

Corry has been named a Tree City USA for seven consecutive years.

The Corry Armory was listed on the National Register of Historic Places in 1991.

Demographics

As of the census of 2000, there were 6,834 people, 2,660 households, and 1,763 families residing in the city. The population density was 1,120.5 people per square mile (432.6/km). There were 2,868 housing units at an average density of 470.2 per square mile (181.5/km). The racial makeup of the city was 98.19% White, 0.29% African American, 0.29% Native American, 0.16% Asian, 0.01% Pacific Islander, 0.09% from other races, and 0.97% from two or more races. Hispanic or Latino of any race were 0.91% of the population. The U.S. Census Bureau estimated Corry's population at 6,331 in 2009.

There were 2,660 households, out of which 32.1% had children under the age of 18 living with them, 48.5% were married couples living together, 13.8% had a female householder with no husband present, and 33.7% were non-families. 29.3% of all households were made up of individuals, and 13.2% had someone living alone who was 65 years of age or older. The average household size was 2.49 and the average family size was 3.07.

In the city, the population was spread out, with 27.3% under the age of 18, 8.6% from 18 to 24, 25.5% from 25 to 44, 21.8% from 45 to 64, and 16.8% who were 65 years of age or older. The median age was 36 years. For every 100 females, there were 88.4 males. For every 100 females age 18 and over, there were 83.1 males.

The median income for a household in the city was $30,967, and the median income for a family was $35,375. Males had a median income of $30,220 versus $22,127 for females. The per capita income for the city was $15,143. About 14.2% of families and 16.4% of the population were below the poverty line, including 21.4% of those under age 18 and 8.2% of those age 65 or over.

Geography and climate
Corry is located at  (41.924947, -79.640511).

Government 
The city of Corry is incorporated as a 3rd-class city under Pennsylvania law. Third-class cities are governed by a commission, in which the mayor and four other members of the city council constitute the commission. The mayor serves as the president of the council. David Mitchell is the mayor of the city of Corry. The Corry City Council's other members are Steven Drake, Bill Roche, Taree Hamilton and Andrew Sproveri. Donna Huffman is city treasurer and Diane L. Cowles is city controller.

Corry is in Pennsylvania's 5th congressional district and is represented in the United States House of Representatives by Republican Glenn Thompson, who was elected in 2008. Republican Scott Hutchinson of the 21st District has represented Corry in the Pennsylvania State Senate since 2013. Corry is contained by the 4th District of the Pennsylvania House of Representatives and is represented by Republican Curt Sonney.

Education

Corry is within the Corry Area School District, which operates a middle school, high school, one elementary school, but two abandoned elementary schools, and a career and technical center. Higher education is locally available through the Corry branch of Mercyhurst College, which offers advanced college credits for high school students and an associate degree in business administration. Adult education and training are offered through the Corry Higher Education Council.

Notable people 
 Emery Bopp (1924–2007), artist
 William Wallace Brown (1836–1926), member of the United States House of Representatives
 Ryan Buell (1982−), paranormal investigator
 Carmen Hill (1895-1990), Major League Baseball player, Corry HS
 Fred Marsh (1924-2006), Major League Baseball player
 Peter McLaughlin, Minnesota state legislator
 Norman T. Newton (1898-1992), Landscape Architect, Scholar
 Linda Kay Olson, Miss America 2nd Runner-up, 1972 
 Charles F. Ritchel (1840–1911), inventor
 James Alexander Robertson (1873−1939), academic historian, archivist and bibliographer
 Karen Smyers (1961−), triathlete

See also 

 List of cities in Pennsylvania
 List of Tree Cities USA

References

Sources

External links

City of Corry
Corry Chamber of Commerce
Corry Area Historical Society & Museum
The Corry Journal
Corry Area School District

 
Cities in Pennsylvania
Populated places established in 1861
Cities in Erie County, Pennsylvania
1861 establishments in Pennsylvania